The Roman Catholic Diocese of Mukachevo is a diocese of the Latin Church of the Catholic Church in Ukraine. Antal Majnek is the current bishop of the diocese. He was appointed to the See of Mukachevo (Hungarian: Munkács) in 1997.

History

The history of the diocese begins 1993 when the Apostolic Administration of Zakarpattia (Latin Name: Transcarpatiae Latinorum) was split off from the Diocese of Szatmár. This is unique among the Ukrainian dioceses, the remainder of which were all split off from Lviv, which has been associated with Polish culture. Mukachevo Roman Catholics are mostly members of the Hungarian minority in Ukraine.  Elevated to a diocese in 2002, its first diocese was Antal Majnek until 28 January 2022.

Geography
The diocese is a suffragan of the Archdiocese of Lviv of the Latins.

Ordinaries
Antal Majnek, O.F.M. (7 October 1997 – 28 January 2022)
Mykola Luchok, O.P. (since 28 January 2022), Apostolic Administrator

See also
Roman Catholicism in Ukraine

External links
 GCatholic.org
 Catholic Hierarchy

Roman Catholic dioceses in Ukraine